The Doctor Speaks Out or The Doctor Says is a 1966 West German-Swiss drama film directed by Aleksander Ford and starring Tadeusz Łomnicki, René Deltgen and Margot Trooger.

The film's sets were designed by Heinrich Weidemann.

Cast
 Tadeusz Łomnicki as Dr. Maurer
 René Deltgen as Dr. Diener
 Margot Trooger as Frau Sidler
 Dieter Borsche as Herr Sidler
 Charles Régnier as Professor
 Peter Oehme as Judge
 Louis V. Arco as Defense lawyer
 Hermann Frick as Prosecutor
 Sabine Bethmann as Frau Maurer
 Gert Westphal as Kriminalkommissar

References

Bibliography 
 Monaco, James. The Encyclopedia of Film. Perigee Books, 1991.

External links 
 

1966 films
1966 drama films
German drama films
West German films
1960s German-language films
Films directed by Aleksander Ford
Swiss drama films
1960s German films